Peter Høeg Gade (born 14 December 1976 in Aalborg, Denmark) is a Danish former professional badminton player. He currently resides in Holte in Copenhagen. He has two children with the former handball player Camilla Høeg.

Gade made his mark in badminton history through his All England Open Badminton Championships singles title in 1999 and his five European Championships crowns in the men's singles event. He topped the world rankings from 1998 to 2001. With his 22 Grand-Prix titles, he has become one of the sport's most successful players. On 22 June 2006, he briefly recaptured the number one spot in the world rankings. This was achieved after winning the Singapore Open and reaching the quarter-final at the Malaysia Open.

With his defeat in the quarter-finals of the 2012 French Open, Gade retired from international competition.

Player attributes
His playing style is known for fast attacks, smooth footwork and constant pressure. His deception is particularly creative for a world badminton player, and he uses a widely recognised and highly successful "trademark shot" (the so-called "double action" of the racket sends the shuttle to the back of the court, while aiming to bring the player towards the net). With a plethora of deceptive shots, he has been known to win points from more outrageous attempts, such as the reverse forehand and backhand (using the opposite side of the racket head to the one anticipated, to make contact with the shuttlecock at a radically different angle).

Career highlights

International Tournament wins
Men's singles unless otherwise noted
1994—World-Junior-Champion in men's doubles (partner Peder Nissen)
1995—European-Junior-Championships
1996—Scottish Open
1997—German Open, Taiwan Open, Hong Kong Open
1998—Japan Open, Swiss Open, Danish Open, Malaysian Open, European Championships
1999—All England Open Badminton Championships, Ipoh Masters, Copenhagen Masters, Japan Open, World GrandPrix
2000—Korea Open, Danish Open, Taiwan Open, European Championships, Copenhagen Masters
2001—Copenhagen Masters, Korea Open
2002—European Championships, US Open, Copenhagen Masters
2004—European Championships, Copenhagen Masters
2005—Korea Open, Copenhagen Masters
2006—European Championships, Aviva Singapore Open, Copenhagen Masters
2007—Malaysian Open, Copenhagen Masters
2008—Denmark Open, French Open, Copenhagen Masters
2009—Korea Open
2010—European Championships, Copenhagen Masters

BWF Super Series

2011

2011 BWF Super Series – Men's Singles Standings

2010

2010 BWF Super Series – Men's Singles Standings

2009

2009 BWF Super Series – Men's Singles Standings

2008

2008 BWF Super Series – Men's Singles Standings

2007

2007 BWF Super Series – Men's Singles Standings

Olympics
Gade represented Denmark in badminton singles in four summer Olympics (2000, 2004, 2008 and 2012).

2000

He reached the semifinals in the 2000 Summer Olympics, where he lost to eventual gold medalist Ji Xinpeng of China. In the bronze medal match, he lost to another Chinese player, Xia Xuanze.

2004

At the 2004 Summer Olympics in men's singles, he defeated Chien Yu-Hsiu of Chinese Taipei and Nikhil Kanetkar of India in the first two rounds. However, in the quarter finals, Gade was defeated by the eventual champion, Taufik Hidayat of Indonesia 15–12, 15–12.

2008

Gade stated that one of his final career goals would be a gold medal at the 2008 Summer Olympics in Beijing. In an interview, he indicated that it might be one of his final big tournaments although not ruling out the possibility of continuing his career after the games. He was planning to retire after the Beijing Olympics and begin coaching badminton. Gade won his first match in the 2008 Beijing Olympics in round two after defeating Nabil Lasmari 21–6, 21–4. In the third round Gade faced Shoji Sato. Gade was nearly beaten after losing the first set 21–19 and Shoji Sato having 2 match points in the second with the score at 18–20. However, Gade won the set 22–20 and went on to win the third set 21–15. Gade lost in straight sets to the Chinese champion Lin Dan in the quarter-final.

2012

In the 2012 Summer Olympics he was defeated by Chen Long of China in the Quarter-Finals.

Other
Danish National Champion: 2000, 2001, 2002, 2004, 2005, 2006, 2007, 2009, 2010, 2011

Retirement
Gade beat two-time Olympic Champion Lin Dan in a farewell exhibition match at the Copenhagen Masters on 27 December 2012 in front of a sold-out crowd at Falconer Salen.

Achievements

BWF World Championships 
Men's singles

European Championships 
Men's singles

World Junior Championships 
Boys' doubles

European Junior Championships 
Boys' singles

Boys' doubles

BWF Superseries (4 titles, 6 runners-up)
The BWF Superseries, launched on 14 December 2006 and implemented in 2007, is a series of elite badminton tournaments, sanctioned by the Badminton World Federation (BWF). BWF Superseries has two levels: Superseries and Superseries Premier. A season of Superseries features twelve tournaments around the world, introduced in 2011, with successful players invited to the Superseries Finals held at the year's end.

Men's singles

  BWF Superseries Finals tournament
  BWF Superseries Premier tournament
  BWF Superseries tournament

IBF Grand Prix (17 titles, 8 runners-up)
The World Badminton Grand Prix sanctioned by International Badminton Federation since 1983.

Men's singles

IBF International (1 title)
Men's singles

Equipment

Rackets
 Yonex Voltric 80 PG (2012 Copenhagen Masters)
 Yonex Voltric Z-FORCE (2012 limited use)
 Yonex Voltric 80 (2011–2012)
 Yonex Arcsaber 10 PG (2010–2011)
 Yonex Arcsaber 10 (2008–2010)
 Yonex Armortec 700 new colour (2006–2008)
 Yonex Armortec 700 (2005–2006)
 Yonex Muscle Power 88 red (2004–2005)
 Yonex Muscle Power 77* (2001 limited use)
 Yonex Titanium 10 (1999 limited use)
 Yonex Isometric Slim 10 (1997–2004)
 Yonex Isometric 300 ( – 1997)

 bg 80 string

Honors
 Special Award of the DBF 2006.
 IBF World Badminton Player of the year 1998

References

External links
 
 
 
 
 
 
 
 

1976 births
Living people
Sportspeople from Aalborg
Danish male badminton players
Badminton players at the 2000 Summer Olympics
Badminton players at the 2004 Summer Olympics
Badminton players at the 2008 Summer Olympics
Badminton players at the 2012 Summer Olympics
Olympic badminton players of Denmark
World No. 1 badminton players